The Earthshot Prize is awarded to 5 winners each year for their contributions to environmentalism. It was first awarded in 2021 and is planned to run annually until 2030. Each winner receives a grant of £1 million to continue their environmental work. The five categories were inspired by the UN Sustainable Development Goals; they are 'the restoration and protection of nature', 'air cleanliness', 'ocean revival', 'waste-free living', and 'climate action'.

The Earthshot Prize was launched in 2020 by Prince William and David Attenborough. The winners are selected by the Earthshot Prize Council, which includes Prince William and Attenborough.

Background and launch

On 31 December 2019, Prince William, Duke of Cambridge announced the Earthshot Prize, after two years of development, to be given to five individuals or organisations who provided impactful and sustainable solutions for Earth's environmental problems between 2021 and 2030. William stated that he felt responsibility to establish the prize as Earth was at a "tipping point" and cited the work of his grandfather Prince Philip, Duke of Edinburgh, father Charles, Prince of Wales, and the broadcaster David Attenborough as inspiring influences. The prize's name is inspired by former US President John F. Kennedy's Moonshot.

William and Attenborough formally launched the project in October 2020, with a prize budget of £50 million over the next decade. To commemorate the launch, William gave a Ted Talk discussing climate change and encouraged world leaders to take action. Prince William and Attenborough both appeared in the ITV documentary A Planet For Us All (2020), which detailed the importance of environmental work and discussed the new prize.

In July 2022, it was announced that after being a part of The Royal Foundation for two years, the Earthshot Prize had become an independent charity. M. Sanjayan, Jason Knauf, Zoë Ware and Jean Christophe Gray were appointed to the board of trustees.

Funding
The project is funded by donations from philanthropists and charitable organisations, including: Aga Khan Development Network, Bloomberg Philanthropies, DP World in partnership with Dubai Expo 2020, the Jack Ma Foundation, Marc and Lynne Benioff, the Paul G. Allen Family Foundation, the World Wide Fund for Nature, the Green Belt Movement, Greenpeace, Conservation International, and the Bezos Earth Fund. The programme's CEO is Hannah Jones.

In an interview about the Earthshot Prize broadcast on 14 October 2021, William told the BBC's Newscast about the rise in "climate anxiety" among younger generations, and suggested that rich entrepreneurs should be "trying to repair this planet, not trying to find the next place to go and live".

Categories and nomination process 
A £1 million prize will be awarded annually between 2021 and 2030 to a winner in each of the five categories:

 the restoration and protection of nature;
 air cleanliness;
 ocean revival;
 waste-free living; and
 climate action

Each area is supported by the UN Sustainable Development Goals and scientifically agreed international measures. Submissions are open to any individual, team, organisation, or government with workable solutions. The Earthshot Prize Council is responsible for determining a winner for each goal every year. There is a five-stage process to select a winner for each Earthshot, designed alongside the Centre for Public Impact. Nominations will be screened with an independent assessment process run by Deloitte. A panel of experts will make recommendations to the Prize Council, who select the final winners, narrowed from fifteen finalists. Shortlisted nominees will also receive resources for "tailored support" and connections with organisations to expand their work.

Earthshot Prize Council 

The Earthshot Prize Council comprises global ambassadors from a wide range of varying sectors dedicated towards positive action in the environmental space, and include thirteen members: Prince William, Queen Rania of Jordan, Cate Blanchett, Christiana Figueres, Dani Alves, David Attenborough, Hindou Oumarou Ibrahim, Indra Nooyi, Jack Ma, Naoko Yamazaki, Ngozi Okonjo-Iweala, Shakira and Yao Ming. To commemorate Earth Day 2021, the Council published an open letter in The Times, urging the public and communities to help with accelerating the fight against climate change. In May 2021, Luisa Neubauer and Ernest Gibson were announced as new members of the council. In September 2021, Michael Bloomberg was named as a global adviser to the winners of the prize.

A book entitled Earthshot: How To Save Our Planet was written to accompany the prizes, written by Colin Butfield and Jonnie Hughes, with contributions from several of the judges. Butfield and Hughes also produced an accompanying five-part BBC One TV series about the project. The book was published in the UK, Europe and across the Commonwealth on 30 September 2021, and in the US on 5 October. The five-part series, titled The Earthshot Prize: Repairing Our Planet, was broadcast by BBC One in the first two weeks of October and available for streaming on BBC iPlayer and Discovery+. The miniseries consisted of documentary style episodes, each based on the five UN Sustainable Development Goals, and were presented by Prince William and David Attenborough.

Earthshot Prize Global Alliance 
In September 2021, it was announced that the Earthshot Prize Global Alliance—consisting of companies such as Arup, Bloomberg L.P., Deloitte, Herbert Smith Freehills, Hitachi, the INGKA Group, Microsoft, MultiChoice, Natura & Co, Safaricom, Salesforce, Unilever, Vodacom, and Walmart—will help "scale up" ideas submitted by the inaugural 15 finalists.

A nine-month Fellowship Programme was launched in 2022 to help the finalists develop more ideas by forming partnerships with various businesses and organisations that are a part of the Earthshot Prize Global Alliance.

2021 Award winners and nominees 

Nominations for the inaugural prize ceremony opened on 1 November 2020, with over 100 nominating partners eligible to submit. The location of the ceremony will alternate each year. The 2021 Earthshot Prize ceremony took place on 17 October 2021 at Alexandra Palace, and was broadcast on Discovery+ and BBC One. Clara Amfo and Dermot O'Leary hosted the event while the awards were presented by the Duchess of Cambridge, Emma Thompson, Emma Watson, David Oyelowo and Mohamed Salah. Ed Sheeran, Coldplay, KSI and Yemi Alade, and Shawn Mendes performed at the event. 60 cyclists pedalling on bikes provided the power for music performances. None of the celebrities flew to London and the stage was built using non-plastic material. All of the guests were advised to choose environmentally appropriate outfits.

15 finalists were announced on 17 September 2021, with the winners being announced on 17 October 2021.

2022 Award winners and nominees 
The 2022 awards ceremony took place at the MGM Music Hall at Fenway in Boston, United States on 2 December, and was broadcast in the UK on BBC One and in the US on PBS. Nominations for the second prize ceremony opened on 6 January 2022, with 300 nominating partners eligible to submit.

15 finalists were announced on 4 November 2022, and the winners were revealed on 2 December. They took part in the event remotely. Sir David Attenborough narrated the opening of the event and Cate Blanchett voiced a lookback at the award's inaugural winners. Clara Amfo and Daniel Dae Kim hosted the event while the awards were presented by the Princess of Wales, David Beckham, Rami Malek, Catherine O'Hara, and Shailene Woodley. Billie Eilish and Finneas, Annie Lennox, Ellie Goulding, and Chloe x Halle performed at the event.

See also

 List of environmental awards

References

External links 

2020 establishments in the United Kingdom
Awards established in 2020
Environmental awards
International awards
William, Prince of Wales